Tvrtko may refer to:

 Tvrtko I of Bosnia, medieval king of Bosnia
 Tvrtko II of Bosnia, medieval king of Bosnia
 Tvrtko Jakovina, Croatian historian
 Tvrtko Kale (born 1974), Croatian-Israeli footballer

See also
 Tvrtko of Bosnia (disambiguation)
 Tvrtko Kotromanić (disambiguation)
 Stephen Kotromanić (disambiguation)
 Prijezda Kotromanić (disambiguation)

Croatian masculine given names